Gueux is a commune in the Marne department in north-eastern France.

See also
Circuit de Reims-Gueux
Communes of the Marne department

References

Communes of Marne (department)